Samir Farid Geagea (  Lebanese pron.: , also spelled Samir Ja'ja'; born 25 October 1952) is a Lebanese politician and militia commander who has been leading the Lebanese Forces party and dissolved militia since 1986.

Born in Ain al-Remaneh in Beirut with origins from Bsharri, Geagea joined the Kataeb Party in his early years. He led the Northern Front in the Lebanese Forces from 1979 to 1984. In March 1985, after the deterioration of the Christian political situation in the eastern regions after the assassination of the Lebanese Forces leader Bachir Gemayel, he led, jointly with Elie Hobeika and Karim Pakradouni, an uprising that led to control of the political situation without any bloodshed. On January 15, 1986, Geagea led a movement against the tripartite agreement sponsored by Syria to become the commander of the Lebanese Forces after the overthrow of Elie Hobeika, the head of the executive body at the time and one of the signatories of the tripartite agreement.

Geagea initially supported the "War of Liberation" declared by disputed Prime Minister General Michel Aoun against the Syrian Army. On January 31, 1990, General Aoun declared war on the Lebanese Forces led by Samir Geagea under the name "elimination war". Led by Samir Geagea, the Lebanese Forces agreed to the Taef Accord peace agreement that ended the civil war and ceded control of its territory and weapons to the army in 1991. In accordance with the agreement, he immediately dissolved the military and security arm of the Lebanese Forces and surrendered all its military assets to the Lebanese Army. But as Beirut was under the control of the Syrian army, the party members were under a lot of pressure and the Syrian army was not going to withdraw as set out in the agreement.

On January 24, 1990, Geagea was appointed a Minister of State in the first post-war cabinet, led by Prime Minister Omar Karami. Geagea rejected the position due to the flagrant control of the cabinet by the Syrian regime. On May 16, 1992, Geagea was again appointed as a minister in the Rashid El Solh cabinet, only to refuse it again for the same reasons. In 1994, Geagea was arrested and put on trial for bombing a church and political killings in the war. He denied the accusations, as he was the target of a political prosecution fabricated by the Syrian-Lebanese security apparatus.

Geagea spent 11 years in solitary confinement, the only war leader to go to jail in Lebanon, while others benefited from an amnesty and took cabinet posts. Following the Cedar Revolution, and the subsequent withdrawal of Syrian forces from Lebanon, a newly elected Lebanese Parliament voted to grant him amnesty on 18 July 2005.

Early life and education 
Geagea was born in the Ain el-Remmeneh district in Beirut on 25 October 1952 to a modest Maronite family from the town of Bsharri in northern Lebanon. His father, Farid Geagea was an adjutant in the Lebanese Army. He attended "Ecole Bénilde" elementary and secondary school in Furn el-Chebek, which was a free private school. With the aid of a scholarship from the Khalil Gibran association, he studied medicine at the American University of Beirut and then at Saint Joseph University. After the outbreak of civil war in 1975, Geagea interrupted his four years studies at the American University of Beirut. He was an active member of the right-wing Phalangist Party, which became the main Christian fighting force upon the outbreak of the Lebanese Civil War in 1975. He is married to MP Sethrida Geagea.

War period (1975–1990) 
Geagea steadily rose through the ranks and led several operations at the request of Bachir Gemayel, then commander of the Phalangist Kataeb Regulatory Forces militia. In June 1978, following the murder of a Phalangist party leader in the North Lebanon called Joud el Bayeh in a power struggle with former president Suleiman Frangieh, Bachir Gemayel ordered Geagea and Elie Hobeika to co-lead a unit to capture the suspects who were taking cover in Frangieh's mansion in Ehden. The incident is known as Ehden massacre. The attacking force (which somehow went past over dozens of Syrian army checkpoints) was met with resistance on the outskirts of Ehden where Geagea was hit. He was transported to Beirut and admitted to Hôtel-Dieu hospital in Achrafieh, Beirut where ironically he was doing his internship. His right hand was partially paralyzed and he never continued his education. Meanwhile, the military operation resulted in the murder of Tony Frangieh and his family. Geagea was later transported to a hospital in France.

Geagea was appointed head of the Lebanese Forces' (LF) militia northern Front in the early 1980s, where he commanded around 1,500 battle-hardened soldiers, drawn mainly from his native town of Bsharri and other towns and villages in Northern Lebanon. Geagea led his men in fierce battles against the Syrian Army in El-Koura, Qnat. From 1982 to 1983, Geagea commanded the Lebanese Forces against Walid Jumblat's Progressive Socialist Party militia, the Palestinians, and the Syrians in a battle for control of the Chouf mountains in central Lebanon.

Following the Israeli withdrawal from Sidon on 15 February 1985 Geagea launched an LF offensive from the Christian villages East and North of Sidon targeting Ain al-Hilwa refugee camp as well as the city itself. By 24 April his fighters were forced to retreat resulting in the exodus of some 60,000 Maronites from the villages of Iqlim al-Kharrub.

On 1 April 1990, during the War of Liberation, Elias Hrawi’s government mandated Fleet Admiral Elie Hayek to take over LF barracks in the governorate. This was part of an agreement between Samir Geagea and Hrawi whereby the army would militarily and politically take over 2/3 of the canton (the remaining 1/3 being the Northern governorate and Achrafieh in East Beirut), but the militia’s 10,000 strong force would remain intact for the time being.

Michel Aoun, however, had publicly stated that he would not accept the handoff or any alliance between the LF and the Hrawi government. As the Elimination War was ravaging East Beirut and its suburbs (up to the Metn), the handoff actually began in Keserwan district – at the level of Nahr el-Kalb – up to Barbara. By May, however, the LF had taken over the entire coastline from Jounieh to Beirut from Aoun’s troops, completely cutting off naval supply routes.  In addition, Geagea placed Hayek in an LF barrack in Jounieh as a symbol of his willingness to integrate with the government, defying Aoun’s refusal of any Hrawi-LF alliance.  These developments, combined with the Syrian army’s support, dramatically shifted the odds in favour of the Taif agreement and its government.

Lebanese Forces 

On 12 March 1985, Geagea and Elie Hobeika orchestrated an internal coup in order to end the leadership of Fouad Abou Nader in the Lebanese Forces. Abou Nader was considered to be too close to his uncle, president Amin Gemayel whose policies were not accepted by most LF leaders. On 15 January 1986, Geagea became head of the Lebanese Forces after overthrowing Hobeika, who was widely accused of treachery in the Lebanese Christian sector for agreeing to a Syrian-sponsored accord (the Tripartite Accord). During the following year, Geagea meticulously rebuilt the LF into an organized, well trained and equipped military force, one of the most advanced forces ever on Lebanese soil. He established social security and public services to fill the void that was created by the war-crippled state administration. He also extracted taxes from the Christian region, offered free open-heart operations and twinned Christians cities with foreign cities in Europe and America and tried to open an airport in the Halat region because the Beirut International Airport (located in the west suburb of Beirut) was under the control of the Syrian forces which made the access for Lebanese Christians almost impossible.

The post-war period (1990) 
In February 1990 General Michel Aoun launched an offensive attempting to dislodge Geagea’s Lebanese Forces from East Beirut. During the fighting the Christian areas of Beirut suffered greater destruction and more casualties than at any time during 15 years of civil war.

On 13 October 1990, Syria ousted General Aoun from the presidential palace in Baabda. Aoun was heading an interim government which filled the void in the absence of a presidential election after the end of President Amin Gemayel's term in office. With Aoun out of the picture, Geagea was now the only leader in the Christian heartland. Geagea was subsequently offered ministerial portfolios in the new Lebanese government (formed on Christmas Eve).

Relations with the Kataeb party 
In addition to being the LF leader, Geagea retained his seat in the Kataeb Politburo. In 1992, he ran for the Kataeb presidential election but lost to Georges Saadeh with whom the conflict grew. Later that year, Saadeh dismissed Geagea and all members of what was known as the "Rescue Committee" from the party. The committee was formed by several members of the Politburo and districts leaders loyal to the LF and Geagea.

Arrest and trial 
There was increased pressure by Syria on Geagea to accept the Syrian presence or face charges. Prior to his arrest, he was contacted by several sympathetic politicians and warned about the forthcoming proceedings and offered safe passage out of Lebanon. Geagea refused to leave. The Syrians exploited the vulnerabilities of the amnesty law promulgated by then president Elias Hrawi for all the crimes and atrocities committed before 1990. This law also stated that any crime committed after that date will void the effect of the amnesty. On 26 January 1994, Geagea went to Qardaha, Syria to offer his condolences to President Hafez al-Assad, following the death of his son Bassel in a car accident. During his visit to Syria, president's brother-in-law, Mohammed Makhlouf, asked him to talk with Syrian officers, but Geagea said that he only came for the funeral, which was considered as a refusal to cooperate with the Syrians.

On 27 February 1994, a bomb exploded in the Church of Sayyidet Al Najet (Our Lady of Deliverance) in the locality of Zouk Mikael killing 9 worshipers and injuring many. It is unknown who perpetrated the bombing and it was ultimately attributed to some shadowy groups, but Samir Geagea was accused of the crime solely for the purpose of voiding the effect of the amnesty law of which he benefited, in the same way as all political and militia leaders from other communities and regions were benefiting despite their many unspeakable crimes throughout the Lebanese civil war. On 23 March 1994, the Lebanese government ordered the dissolution of the LF and Geagea's deputy Fouad Malek was taken into custody. Geagea himself was arrested on 21 April 1994 in his village Ghadras, on charges of ordering the church bombing, of attempting to undermine government authority by "maintaining a militia in the guise of a political party", of instigating acts of violence, and of committing assassinations during the Lebanese Civil War. He was accused of the assassinations of former prime minister Rashid Karami, National Liberal Party leader Dany Chamoun and his family, and former LF member Elias Al Zayek. He was also accused of attempting to kill Minister Michel Murr. He was acquitted in the church case but given four life sentences in the other cases. Amnesty International criticized Samir Geagea's trial and conviction, citing that it was politically motivated and unjust.

Imprisonment 
Geagea was incarcerated for 11 years in a small windowless solitary cell in the third basement level of the Lebanese Ministry of Defense in Yarze. His health status was jeopardized and he lost weight dramatically due to the unsanitary condition of the ill lit and poorly ventilated prison cell. He was deprived of access to media and the outside world and was only allowed to see his wife and close relatives. All of Geagea's conversations were monitored and he was barred from talking politics with anyone.

For the duration of his incarceration, Geagea maintained that he meditated and reviewed his actions during the war to determine if what he did was right. He busied himself with reading literature, Hindu philosophy, the Qur'an, Christian theology and mysticism namely the works of Jesuit priest Teilhard de Chardin.

Release 
Leaders of the Cedar Revolution considered the Geagea trials and sentences to be unjust, politically motivated, and orchestrated by the vassal government that ruled Lebanon during the Syrian occupation to oust Geagea from the political scene and dismantle the Lebanese Forces. When supporters of the Cedar Revolution won the majority in the 2005 parliamentary elections, they lobbied for an amnesty law to free Geagea from his disputed sentences.

The Lebanese Parliament passed an amnesty bill on 18 July 2005 to free Geagea. Given the sectarian balance of Lebanon, three dozen Islamist criminals were released with Geagea. The bill was subsequently signed by the then president Émile Lahoud. Geagea was released from prison on 26 July 2005 and left Lebanon for medical care. He returned to Lebanon on 25 October (his birthday), and lived in the Cedars region, his ancestral homeland, in northern Lebanon until 11 December 2006, after which he moved to a hotel in Bzoummar in Keserwan. On 30 June 2007, he moved to a new residence in Maarab, Keserwan.

Current political activity 
On the Lebanese political scene, Geagea and the LF are considered to be the main Christian component of the 14 March Alliance.

In September 2008, Geagea pronounced in front of thousands of rallying supporters in Jounieh a historical apology. The apology read:

Internationally, Geagea tried to renew his relations with influential countries such as the United States and France. On 19 March 2007, he met then French president Jacques Chirac in the Élysée Palace. In March 2008, he held talks in the US with officials at the White House, including then Secretary of State Condoleezza Rice, then NSA Stephen Hadley and then chairman of the Foreign Affairs Subcommittee on the Middle East and South Asia Gary Ackerman.

A 2015 leak of documents from Saudi Arabia's Foreign Affairs Ministry revealed that Geagea had asked for money to pay for bodyguards and boasted of his "preparedness to do whatever the kingdom asks of him."

The Lebanese Forces made gains in the 15 May 2022 general elections. It became the largest Christian party in Parliament.

Assassination attempt (2012) 
On 4 April 2012, at 11:30-11:33 am, gunshots were heard in Geagea's Ma'Arab Complex. Geagea's security forces scouted the area, and found shells belonging to a 12.7 caliber sniper rifle, a high-tech rifle produced only by the United States and/or Russia, not available in the Lebanese infantries, the Lebanese Armed Forces or the black market, suggesting that the gun could only be obtained by one powerful party.  Speculators claim the perpetrators to be pro-Syrian forces, most likely Hezbollah. Account of the story, as described in the press conference immediately following the attempt, claim Geagea to have been walking outside in the garden surrounding his mansion. Geagea bent over to pick up a flower, while bent over, Geagea heard gunshots, and immediately lay low on the ground, while his security forces took care of the situation. At the location where the shot would have killed him, two bullets had pierced through the wall. They claim the shooters to have been at least a kilometer away, stationed west of the residence (but the body guards were unable to see them due to the thick trees), and the operation to have been planned for months to silence Geagea, the only strong vocal critic against the Syrian/Iranian forces and the incumbent government. The Lebanese security forces have uncovered that a nine-member assassination team divided into three groups was involved in the killing attempt; two of the three groups were in charge of firing on Geagea.

Candidacy for presidency (2014) 
In 2014, Geagea declared his candidacy for the Lebanese presidential elections to succeed President Michel Suleiman, whose 6-year term was to end on 25 May 2014. Geagea enjoyed the comprehensive political backing of the March 14 Alliance for the presidency. Free Patriotic Movement's MP Michel Aoun said that he would insist on holding the parliamentary election on schedule if Future Movement's Saad Hariri did not support his candidacy for the presidency or if a new president will not be elected before September. Geagea challenged Aoun to run against him or move to a "plan B" that would enable a consensual candidate that is not considered partisan as being from either of the two political alliances, which, in addition to the two, are Phalange's Amine Gemayel and Marada Movement's Suleiman Frangieh.

After the sixth round of voting failed, Lebanese Democratic Party leader Talal Arslan suggested that the president should be directly elected by the people. In doing so, he said: "The presidential crisis is a major insult to the Lebanese nation.  The only way to save the nation and restore respect to the presidency is by holding the election directly by the people." Lebanese Forces MP Antoine Zahra added that Geagea remained the party's candidate

However, the country entered into a 2 years presidential deadlock, which ended in 2016, with Geagea backing up his longtime rival Michel Aoun for the presidency through the Maarab Accord. Aoun was elected president, ending more than two years of presidential vacuum.

References

External links 
Jean-Marc Aractingi, La politique à mes trousses, Paris, Éditions l'Harmattan, 2006

 Official Website about Samir Geagea
 Hussain Abdul-Hussain: Lebanon's Samir Geagea: A Maverick --Huffington Post--

Videos
  Part of a documentary (in Arabic) on Samir Geagea's life in prison. It shows how raising a political issue between Geagea and his wife during her visit to him can result in the interruption of the visit.
 
  Samir Geagea Documentary (in Arabic with English subtitles) human rights violation and forged investigations under terrorism, void trials and suppression of liberties
  Appearance on Lebanese Broadcasting Corporation

1952 births
Living people
American University of Beirut alumni
Candidates for President of Lebanon
Lebanese assassins
Lebanese Forces politicians
Lebanese Maronites
Lebanese mass murderers
Lebanese murderers
Lebanese people convicted of murder
People from Bsharri
People of the Lebanese Civil War
Politicians convicted of murder
Saint Joseph University alumni
Warlords